William Henry Gill (24 October 1839 - 27 June 1923) was a Manx musical scholar who wrote and composed anthem of Isle of Man, "Arrane Ashoonagh Dy Vannin".

Life and career
Gill was born at Marsala, Sicily to Manx parents, and he was educated at King William's College. He lived in London most of his life but remained interested in his roots. The anthem is a traditional Manx ballad. Gill's words were published as "Eaisht oo as Clash-tyn" ("Listen and Hear") in Manx National Songs in 1896. "The Manx Fisherman's Evening Hymn" and "Peel Castle."  Gill also collected and arranged material in England, particularly that associated with Sussex.

Gill also published A Manx Wedding and Other Songs.

References

1839 births
1923 deaths
British composers
Manx culture
Manx language activists
Manx nationalists
People educated at King William's College
People from Marsala
National anthem writers
People from Angmering